Dermis García (born January 7, 1998) is a Dominican professional baseball infielder for the Oakland Athletics of Major League Baseball (MLB). He made his MLB debut in 2022.

Career

New York Yankees
García was considered to be the best available free agent in the 2014 international signing class. He signed with the New York Yankees for a $3.2 million signing bonus. García spent seven seasons in the Yankees’ farm system, minus the missed 2020 season because of the COVID-19 pandemic, and appeared for the rookie-level Gulf Coast Yankees, the rookie-level Pulaski Yankees, the Single-A Charleston RiverDogs, the High-A Tampa Tarpons, and the Double-A Somerset Patriots. In 469 games played for the affiliates, García had a .230 batting average, 101 home runs, and 276 runs batted in.

Oakland Athletics
On March 11, 2022, García signed a minor league contract with the Oakland Athletics, receiving a non-roster invitation to spring training. He began the 2022 season with the Triple-A Las Vegas Aviators. The Athletics will promoted García to the major leagues on July 10. He made his MLB debut on July 12, batting 1-for-3 with two strikeouts.

García was optioned to Triple-A Las Vegas to begin the 2023 season.

See also
 List of Major League Baseball players from the Dominican Republic

References

External links

Living people
1998 births
Charleston RiverDogs players
Gigantes del Cibao players
Gulf Coast Yankees players
Las Vegas Aviators players
Major League Baseball first basemen
Major League Baseball players from the Dominican Republic
Oakland Athletics players
Pulaski Yankees players
Somerset Patriots players
Sportspeople from Santo Domingo
Tampa Tarpons players